The Jewish population of Latin America has risen to more than 500,000 – more than half of whom live in Argentina, with large communities also present in Brazil and Mexico.

The following is a list of some renowned past and present Honduran Jews (not all of them with both parents Jewish, not all of them practicing Judaism), arranged by their main field of activity:

 Boris Goldstein (Honduras), donated land for Maguen David Synagogue.
Jacobo Goldstein, journalist, businessman.
Ricardo Maduro Joest, Politician, Honduran ex president.
Martin Baide Urmeneta, lawyer, journalist, politician. 
 Jaime Rosenthal , businessman, politician.
 Yani Rosenthal, politician
 Yankel Rosenthal, C.D. Marathón president.

See also
 List of Latin American Jews
 List of Hondurans
 Lists of Jews

References

External links
 Comunidad Judia de Honduras 

Honduras
 
Jews
Jews,Honduran